Mrs. H. D. Warren  LL.D. (1862-1952), or Sarah Trumbull Van Lennep as she was known before she married H. D. Dormand in 1885, was a prominent Toronto philanthropist. She helped build Toronto's cultural, institutional and social safety structures, and served on the Board of the Royal Ontario Museum (ROM) for 35 years, as its first, and for a long time, its only, woman member. She was a member of a generation of donors who were said to be "endlessly generous" to the strength of the present collections of the Royal Ontario Museum. In her philanthropy, she was sought for her gifts of constructive leadership as much as for her financial support.

Career
Sarah Van Lennep was born in Orange, New Jersey in 1862, of an established family in New England that was of Dutch descent (said to reach back to 1330) intermingled with European nobility.
She was an eminent philanthropist when she married Harry Dorman Warren, the first president of Gutta Percha & Rubber, Ltd. (later, the Dominion Rubber Company), in June 1885. They came to Canada in 1887.
After the death of her husband in 1909, Mrs. Warren assumed his position as chairman of the board of directors.

She was involved in a number of philanthropic endeavours in Toronto. In 1911, Mrs. Warren was the first female trustee of the Royal Ontario Museum and its first vice-chairman. She also was the only female member of the board of trustees and donated regularly to the museum as one of its most reliable benefactors. In 1914, she gave the ROM the 11th century The figure of a luohan, from China, one of the treasures of the museum and permanently on view. She also gave the museum a collection of Chinese porcelain. Along with Sigmund Samuel and others, she also helped the director of the museum, Charles Trick Currelly, providing him with a protective safety net for purchases when he overextended his budget. Together with Samuel, she was one of the founders of Ten Friends for the Arts (for the ROM) as well as being one of the founders of the Art Gallery of Ontario (then the Art Gallery of Toronto). Currelly mentions the important role she played in many places in his book, I brought the Ages Home. Mrs. Warren was considered so helpful by the Museum that she even had a dinosaur named after her, the Parksosaurus warrenae.

Among her other charities, she assisted in the founding of the Department of Social Work at the University of Toronto by donating the funds needed to pay for the salary of a director. She was, of course, kept in touch with the person chosen. In 1914, the Department of Social Service (which is now the Factor-Inwentash Faculty of Social Work) was established, making it the first school of social work in Canada. She also encouraged the Canadian Girl Guides (an outgrowth of the Boy Scout movement) as one of the Canadian Council of statutory incorporators. She became the head of the organization in 1922 and remained chief commissioner for almost twenty years. In 1938, she gave her home at 95 Wellesley Street East to become the headquarters for the Red Cross. During World War II, she was president of the Women's Patriotic League in Toronto which assisted in social work and ran an Emergency workroom with various functions, among them ties to Social Services. Although she believed in education for women, she did not believe in universal suffrage. She founded an association opposed to women's suffrage in 1914 and became its president, although she embraced the vote for women when it came in 1917. Philanthropy provided her with a way to have certain aspects of power in society at a time when women were excluded from politics.

Warren belonged to many clubs; she was a life member of the Women's Art Association and the Royal Canadian Institute.

Honours and awards
She received the CBE IN 1905. In 1917, she received the Lady of Grace insignia decoration of the Hospital of St. John of Jerusalem in England for service in the First World War. The University of Toronto gave her an L.L.D. in 1933.

Personal life
Her second child (of five), Helen Huntington Warren (1889 – 1982) married Charles S. Band and with him, collected an important group of Canadian paintings, such as Emily Carr's 1929 The Indian Church (renamed Church at Yuquot Village in 2018 by the Art Gallery of Ontario). In 1969, at Band's death, the collection was gifted to the Art Gallery of Ontario.

One son, Frederick Turnbull Warren, was killed at Ypres in the First World War.

References

Bibliography 

1862 births
1962 deaths
Canadian philanthropists
Canadian women philanthropists
American emigrants to Canada